The 1994–95 Turkish Cup was the 33rd edition of the tournament that determined the association football Süper Lig Turkish Cup champion under the auspices of the Turkish Football Federation (TFF). champion under the auspices of the Turkish Football Federation (TFF). Trabzonspor successfully contested Galatasaray on both legs of the finals. The results of the tournament also determined which clubs would be promoted or relegated.

First round
The first round matches were played on the first team's home ground on 21 September 1994.

Second round
Second round matches were played on 5 October 1994 on the first team's home ground.

Third round

Fourth round

Fifth round

Sixth round

Quarter-finals

Semi-finals

Summary table

|}

1st leg

2nd leg

Final

1st leg

2nd leg

See also
 1994–95 1.Lig

References

Turkish Cup seasons
Cup
Turkish